Senator Gaines may refer to:

Matthew Gaines (1840–1900), Texas State Senate
Ted Gaines (born 1958), California State Senate
William E. Gaines (1844–1912), Virginia State Senate